Li Tixiang (Chinese: 李提香; Pinyin: Lǐ Tíxiāng;  ; born 1 September 1989) is a Chinese footballer who currently plays as a left-footed midfielder or centre-back for Zhejiang in the Chinese Super League.

Club career
Li started his football career in 2009 when he was promoted to Beijing Guoan's first team squad. The following season in an attempt to gain more playing time Li was loaned to Beijing Guoan's satellite team Beijing Guoan Talent, which would play as a foreign team in Singapore's S.League in 2010. Wearing the number 10 shirt, Li served as the key player of the team. He made his senior debut in a 1–0 home defeat against Étoile FC on 12 February 2010. He scored his first senior goal in the first round of 2010 Singapore Cup which Beijing Guoan Talent lost to invited foreign team Kitchee from Hong Kong 2–1. On 7 September, the club was involved in a brawl during a match with Young Lions at Jalan Besar Stadium. Li was fined S$2,500 by Football Association of Singapore (FAS) for participating the brawl. He scored his first senior league goal on 19 October in a 3–1 home defeat against Albirex Niigata (Singapore).

Li returned to Beijing Guoan in 2011. On 25 May, he made his debut for Beijing Guoan on the third round of 2011 Chinese FA Cup which Beijing beat Nanchang Hengyuan 6–1 at Workers Stadium, coming on as a substitute for Zhang Xizhe in the 46th minute. His first Super League debut came on 2 July in a match against Shaanxi Renhe coming on as substitute for Piao Cheng in a 1–1 draw.

In January 2014, Li was loaned to Segunda Liga side Tondela until the end of 2013/14 season. However, he failed to establish himself within the team and played just one match in the final round of the season which Tondela lost to Moreirense 1–0 on 11 May 2014. Tondela officially announced Li's departure on 12 May 2014.

On 14 July 2016, Li transferred to Chinese Super League side Shijiazhuang Ever Bright. He made his debut for Shijiazhuang on 31 July 2016 in a Hebei Derby match against Hebei China Fortune. He played nine matches for Shijiazhuang in the second half of the season.

On 19 November 2016, Li moved to fellow Super League side Guangzhou R&F on a free transfer after Shijiazhuang relegated to the second tier. He made his debut for the club on 1 April 2017 in a 1–0 away victory against Yanbian Funde, coming on as a substitute for Chen Zhizhao in the 62nd minute. On 18 June 2017, Li was involved in a collision and was sent off during a league match with Shanghai SIPG. He received a ban of 5 matches by the Chinese Football Association.

After six seasons at Guangzhou he would join another top tier club in Zhejiang on 18 January 2023.

Personal life
Li's given name, Tixiang, comes from the Chinese translation of Italian painter Titian (Chinese: 提香).

Career statistics
.

References

External links 

1989 births
Living people
Sportspeople from Tangshan
Chinese footballers
Footballers from Hebei
Beijing Guoan F.C. players
Cangzhou Mighty Lions F.C. players
Guangzhou City F.C. players
Singapore Premier League players
Chinese Super League players
Liga Portugal 2 players
Chinese expatriate footballers
Expatriate footballers in Portugal
Chinese expatriate sportspeople in Portugal
Expatriate footballers in Singapore
Chinese expatriate sportspeople in Singapore
Association football midfielders